Chen Kang may refer to:

 Chen Chung-hwan (1905–1992), scholar of ancient Greek and Western philosophy
 Chen Kang (badminton) (born 1965), Chinese badminton player